Prochoreutis bella is a moth of the family Choreutidae. It is known from Tadzhikistan.

The wingspan is about 9 mm.

References

Prochoreutis